Yangon City Hall (YCH) is the city hall of Yangon, the largest city of Myanmar, and the seat of the city's administrative body, Yangon City Development Committee (YCDC). The building is considered a fine example of syncretic Burmese architecture, featuring traditional tiered roofs called pyatthat, and was designed by Burmese architect U Tin, who also designed Central Railway Station. Construction began in 1926 and ended in 1936. The city hall occupies the former site of the Ripon Hall.

The city hall has been the focal point of several major political demonstrations, including a 1964 People's Peace Committee rally supported by Thakin Kodaw Hmaing, which attracted 200,000 people and was subsequently clamped down by Ne Win's military junta. and the site of several bombings, including one in 2000, 2008, and 2009.

Centrally located in downtown Yangon, it is next to several important landmarks such as Sule Pagoda, Maha Bandula Park, High Court, and the Main Post Office.

The building is listed on the Yangon City Heritage List.

Gallery

References

Government buildings in Myanmar
Buildings and structures in Yangon
Seats of local government